Lucien Godeaux (1887–1975) was a prolific Belgian mathematician. His total of more than 1000 papers and books, 669 of which are found in Mathematical Reviews, made him one of the most published mathematicians. He was the sole author of all but one of his papers.

He is best remembered for work in algebraic geometry. From Liège, he was attracted to the work of the Italian school of algebraic geometry by the work of one of its masters, Federigo Enriques. Godeaux went to Bologna to study with him. The Godeaux surface is a construction of a special type, which has subsequently been much studied.

Works

  (1927)
  (1931)
  (1933)
  (1933)
  (1934)
  (1934)
  (1934)
  (1935)
  (1937)
  (1940)
  (1946)
  (1946)
 
  (1949) 
  (1949)

References
 Lucien Godeaux, Biographie nationale publiée par l'Académie royale de Belgique, 27 (1938)
 Hommage au Professeur Lucien Godeaux. Librairie Universitaire, Louvain, 1968

Notes

1887 births
1975 deaths
20th-century  Belgian  mathematicians